The Manuripi River is a river in Bolivia and Peru.

See also 
 List of rivers of Bolivia
 List of rivers of Peru

References 

 Rand McNally, The New International Atlas, 1993.

Rivers of Pando Department
Rivers of Madre de Dios Region